This is a list of things named after the Austrian theoretical physicist Erwin Schrödinger.

Quantum physics
Einstein–Schrödinger equation, see Wheeler–DeWitt equation
Schrödinger's cat, a thought experiment devised by Schrödinger that illustrates what he saw as the problem of the Copenhagen interpretation of quantum mechanics applied to everyday objects
Schrödinger equation, an equation formulated by Schrödinger that describes how the quantum state of a physical system changes in time
Schrödinger–Pauli equation
Schrödinger field, a quantum field which obeys the Schrödinger equation
Schrödinger–HJW theorem, a result about density matrices
Schrödinger method, a method used to solve some problems of distribution and occupancy
Schrödinger operator, see Hamiltonian (quantum mechanics)
Schrödinger paradox, the paradox that living systems increase their organization despite the Second Law of Thermodynamics
Schrödinger picture, a formulation of quantum mechanics in which the state vectors evolve in time, but the operators (observables and others) are constant
Schrödinger's pure-affine theory
Schrödinger–Newton equation
Rayleigh–Schrödinger perturbation theory
Robertson–Schrödinger relation

Related mathematical concepts and equations
Logarithmic Schrödinger equation
Nonlinear Schrödinger equation
Schrödinger functional
Schrödinger group, the symmetry group of the free particle Schrödinger equation

Astronomy
Schrödinger (crater), a lunar impact crater
Vallis Schrödinger, a long, nearly linear valley that lies on the far side of the Moon
13092 Schrödinger, a main belt asteroid

Other
Schrödinger logic
 The Erwin Schrödinger International Institute for Mathematical Physics 
Erwin Schrödinger Prize of the Austrian Academy of Sciences (1956) 
Schrödinger Medal
 Schrödinbugs, a type of software bugs, related to Heisenbugs, that manifest themselves in running software only after a programmer notices that the code should never have worked in the first place.
"Schrödinger" – A Dirac codec implementation developed by David Schleef.
Schrödinger (company), a scientific software company
Schrödinger (Hellsing), a fictional character in the Hellsing manga series by Kouta Hirano

Popular culture

Schrödinger's Cat trilogy

See also
Schrödinger (disambiguation)

References

Schrodinger, Erwin
Erwin Schrödinger
caca